Rao Bahadur Namasivayam Sivaraj (29 September 1892 – 29 September 1964) was an Indian lawyer, politician and Scheduled Caste activist from the state of Tamil Nadu.

Early life and education 

Sivaraj was born into a Paraiyer family to Namsivayam, an accounts officer, on 29 September 1892 in the town of Cuddapah in the then Madras Presidency. His ancestors were from the town of Poonamallee near Madras. N. Sivaraj passed his matriculation in 1907 and did B.A from Presidency College, Madras in 1911. In 1915 he graduated as a lawyer from the Madras Law College and practised as a junior under Sir C. P. Ramaswamy Iyer. He worked as a lecturer in the Madras Law College for a period of thirteen years.

Family 
Sivaraj was married to Annai Meenambal and had four children.

Politics 

Sivaraj was one of the prominent leaders in Depressed Class Federation. He was one of the founding members of the Justice Party in 1917 and supported it till 1926. He was mayor in Madras Municipal Corporation in 1945 and served till 1946. He was nominated to the Madras Legislative Council in 1926 and served as member till 1937. From 1937 to 1945, Sivaraj served as a member of Imperial Legislative Council. He participated in the 1952, 1957 and 1962 Lok Sabha elections and served as the Member of Parliament from Chengalpattu constituency.

He was an active member of Self Respect Movement, Anti-Brahminism movement and Women's Rights movement in Tamil Nadu along with Periyar E.V. Ramaswamy.

All India Scheduled Castes Federation was a first all India political party exclusively for the Depressed Class founded by B. R. Ambedkar in a national convention held at Nagpur during 17–20 July 1942. It was presided by Sivaraj and he was elected as its first President.

When the Republican Party of India was founded in 1957, he was again elected as its first president and continued working to establish the organisation until he died in 1964.

Notes

References 

 

1892 births
1964 deaths
Lok Sabha members from Tamil Nadu
Members of the Central Legislative Assembly of India
Mayors of Chennai
India MPs 1957–1962
20th-century Indian lawyers
People from Kadapa district
Indian Tamil politicians
Activists from Tamil Nadu
People from Kanchipuram district
Republican Party of India politicians
Scheduled Castes Federation politician